Gomoa-Awutu-Effutu-Senya District is a former district council that was located in Central Region, Ghana. Originally created as an district council in 1975. However, on 1988, it was split off into two new district assemblies: Awutu/Effutu/Senya District (capital: Winneba) and Gomoa District (capital: Apam). The district council was located in the southeast part of Central Region and had Winneba as its capital town.

References

Central Region (Ghana)

Districts of the Central Region (Ghana)